Skyhigh Security is a cloud security software company.

History 
Skyhigh Networks was founded in 2011 by Rajiv Gupta, Sekhar Sarukkai, and Kaushik Narayan. In November 2016 Dropbox announced partnerships with Skyhigh Networks Inc and some other security companies. Also in November 2016, Skyhigh Networks was recognized by the Forrester Research.

McAfee, an American global computer security software company, and Skyhigh Networks announced a definitive agreement to combine businesses on November 27, 2017. The deal closed in January 2018. According to Financial Times Skyhigh Networks CEO Rajiv Gupta runs McAfee’s new cloud business unit.

In March 2021, McAfee announced that its enterprise business was acquired by private equity firm Symphony Technology Group (STG) for US$4bn.

References 

Computer security companies
Computer security software companies